Washington Decoded is a monthly online newsletter presenting articles on American history. Founded in March 2007 by editor Max Holland, the site publishes new pieces on the 11th of each month, with additional "extra" features. The site features book reviews and articles by authors, journalists, and scholars including John Earl Haynes, Harvey Klehr, Merle L. Pribbenow, Jeffrey T. Richelson, Sheldon M. Stern, and Holland, many of whose articles published elsewhere are also hosted on the site. It has hosted articles on a wide range of topics such as Watergate, Cold War History, 9/11, John F. Kennedy's assassination, and intelligence-related subjects. In November 2009, Washingtonian magazine featured a version of a WashingtonDecoded.com article on Richard Nixon's Deep Throat.

The banner of WashingtonDecoded.com features an edited quote from a 1946 George Orwell essay, "Political language . . . is designed to make lies sound truthful . . . and to give an appearance of solidity to pure wind."

Articles published by the newsletter (2007-2009)
 "Drugs, Corruption, and Justice in Vietnam and Afghanistan: A Cautionary Tale," by Merle Pribbenow, 11 November 2009
 "Richard Nixon's Own Deep Throat," by Max Holland, 3 November 2009
 "The Vanity of Vanity Fair," by Max Holland, 11 October 2009
 "The Death of Conservatism and Other Vital Center Illusions," by Andrew Hartman, 11 September 2009
 "Birthers, Truthers, and Buffs: The Paranoid Style," by Jefferson Flanders, 11 August 2009
 "Why Did I.F. Stone Sidestep the Hiss Case?," by Max Holland, 11 July 2009
 "In Denial: Round 11," by John Earl Haynes and Harvey Klehr, 10 June 2009
 "The Politics of Postmortems," by Max Holland, 11 February 2009
 "Concocting the Dots," by Brian Latell, 11 January 2009
 "The Underwood Hoax," by Max Holland, 11 December 2008
 "11 Seconds in Dallas Redux: Filmed Evidence," by Max Holland and Kenneth Scearce, 11 November 2008
 "The Politics of Association: Ayers vs. Kravis," by Max Holland, 11 October 2008
 "The Secret That Wasn't: Deep Throat Exposed in 1973," by Max Holland, 11 September 2008
 "The Ford Files," by Max Holland, 11 August 2008
 "Cold War Origins," by Sheldon M. Stern, 11 July 2008
 "Indoctrination U," by Don Bohning, 11 June 2008
 "Still Guilty After All These Years: Sirhan B. Sirhan," by Mel Ayton, 11 May 2008
 "Harvard Does Dallas," by Max Holland, 11 April 2008
 "The Road To Nowhere," by John McAdams, 11 March 2008
 "Civics Lesson," by Max Holland, 11 February 2008
 "Five Best Books on the Conspiracy Mindset," by Max Holland, 3 February 2008
 "Commission Confidential," by Max Holland, 30 January 2008
 "Doubt and Disbelief in the Warren Report," by Max Holland and Tara Marie Egan, 11 January 2008
 "McCarthy, According to Evans (and Novak)," by John Earl Haynes, 11 December 2007
 "Credit Where Credit is Due," by Max Holland, 11 December 2007
 "JFK's Death, Re-Framed," by Max Holland and Johann Rush, 22 November 2007, also available as reprinted in The New York Times, "JFK's Death, Re-Framed"
 "What Oswald Wrought: Lament of a Generation," by Max Holland, 11 November 2007
 "What Did LBJ Know About the Cuban Missile Crisis? And When Did He Know It?," by Max Holland and Tara Marie Egan, 19 October 2007
 "The Cuban Missile Crisis 45 Years Later: A Personal and Professional Remembrance," by Sheldon M. Stern, 11 October 2007
 "Sins of Omission and Commission," by Jeffrey T. Richelson, 11 September 2007
 "The Quiet Vietnamese," by Merle L. Pribbenow, 11 August 2007
 "Camelot and Cuba," by Don Bohning, 11 July 2007
 "Outing Deep Throat," by Max Holland, 11 June 2007
 "A Word About Lee Harvey Oswald," by Priscilla McMillan, 11 June 2007
 "Deep Throat 3.0," by William Gaines and Max Holland, 11 May 2007
 "The New McCarthyism," by John Earl Haynes and Harvey Klehr, 11 April 2007
 "11 Seconds in Dallas, Not Six," by Max Holland and Johann Rush, 11 March 2007

Editorial board
David Barrett, professor, Villanova University;
Barton Bernstein, professor, Stanford University;
William Burr, senior analyst, National Security Archive;
Thomas Ferguson, professor, University of Massachusetts;
William Gaines, investigative reporter (ret.), Chicago Tribune;
Irwin Gellman, author;
John Haynes, historian, Library of Congress;
Joan Hoff, professor, Montana State University;
Mark Hulbert, editor, Hulbert Financial Digest;
William Joyce, director, Special Collections, Penn State Libraries;
Martin Kelly, professor (ret.), Hobart & William Smith Colleges;
Mark Kramer, editor, Journal of Cold War Studies;
Stanley Kutler, professor (ret.), University of Wisconsin;
Patricia Lambert, author & journalist;
Charles Lewis, professor, American University;
Priscilla McMillan, author & journalist;
Anna Nelson, professor, American University;
Jay Peterzell, journalist;
Thomas Powers, author & journalist;
Leo Ribuffo, professor, George Washington University;
Jeffrey Richelson, senior fellow, National Security Archive;
Priscilla Roberts, lecturer, University of Hong Kong;
Thomas Schwartz, professor, Vanderbilt University;
Sheldon Stern, historian (ret.), John F. Kennedy Library;
Jay Tolson, author & journalist;
Alan Tonelson, research fellow, US Business and Industry Council Educational Foundation
Richard Whalen, author & journalist

References

External links
 

American political websites
History websites of the United States
Internet properties established in 2007